George Oscar Rathbun (October 16, 1802 – January 4, 1870) was an American lawyer and politician who served two terms as a U.S. Representative from New York from 1843 to 1847.

Biography
Born in Scipioville, near Auburn, New York, the son of Edward and Anna Fuller Rathbun. He attended the Auburn schools, studied law, attained admitted to the bar and commenced practice in Auburn. He married Eliza Treat Gould on October 16, 1823.

A Democrat, he served as Clerk of the Cayuga County Board of Supervisors and was Auburn's Postmaster from 1837 to 1841.

Congress 
Rathbun was elected to the Twenty-eighth and Twenty-ninth Congresses, serving from March 4, 1843, to March 3, 1847.

During his first term, he was Chairman of the Committee on Revolutionary Pensions, and in his second he was Chairman of the Judiciary Committee.

On April 23, 1844, Rathbun was involved in a physical confrontation on the House floor with former Speaker John White. White, a Whig, was delivering a speech in defense of Senator Henry Clay, the Whig nominee for President in that year's presidential election, and objected to a ruling from the Speaker denying him time to conclude his remarks. When Rathbun told White to be quiet, White confronted him and their disagreement lead to a fistfight between the two with dozens of their colleagues rushing to break it up. During the disturbance, an unknown visitor fired a pistol into the crowd, wounding a police officer. Both Rathbun and White subsequently apologized for their actions.

Later career 
Rathbun opposed slavery and later became involved with the Barnburners.  He became a Republican when that party was founded in the 1850s.

He continued to practice law and was a Delegate to the 1867 New York constitutional convention.

Death and burial
Rathbun died in Auburn, New York on January 4, 1870.  He was interred in Auburn's Fort Hill Cemetery.

Sources

External links

Rathbun Family Association, Rathbun, Rathbone, Rathburn Family Historian, 1984, page 54
Blair and Rives, Journal of the U.S. House of Representatives, 1844, page 881
Jonathan Halperin Earle, Jacksonian Antislavery and the Politics of Free Soil, 1824-1854, 2004, page 74

1802 births
1870 deaths
Politicians from Auburn, New York
New York (state) lawyers
New York (state) Democrats
New York (state) Republicans
Members of the United States House of Representatives from New York (state)
People from Scipio, New York
19th-century American politicians
19th-century American lawyers